Tirabrutinib (brand name Velexbru) is a drug used for the treatment of autoimmune disorders and hematological malignancies.

Tirabrutinib was approved in March 2020 in Japan for the treatment of recurrent or refractory primary central nervous system lymphoma.  In addition, tirabrutinib is in clinical development by Ono Pharmaceutical and Gilead Sciences in the United States, Europe, and Japan for autoimmune disorders, chronic lymphocytic leukemia, B cell lymphoma, Sjogren's syndrome, pemphigus, and rheumatoid arthritis.

Tirabrutinib is an irreversible inhibitor of Bruton's tyrosine kinase.

References 

Drugs acting on the cardiovascular system
Purines
Pyrrolidines
Phenol ethers